Anadhai Anandhan is a 1970 Indian Tamil-language film directed by directed by Krishnan–Panju and produced by Muthuvel Movies. It stars A. V. M. Rajan, Muthuraman, R. S. Manohar and Anjali Devi. The bond between the lead heroine Jayalalithaa with the orphaned child played by Master Sekhar was the highlight of the film. The film was simultaneously made in Hindi as Chanda Aur Bijli, which released earlier in 1969. It was a successful film on its release. This film was remade in Telugu as Akka Thamudu in 1972.

Plot

Cast 
 A. V. M. Rajan
 Jayalalithaa
 Nagesh
 Master Sekhar
 R. S. Manohar
 R. Muthuraman
 Anjali Devi
 Jayakumari
T. K. Bagavathi
O. A. K. Thevar
 Thengai Srinivasan
Pakoda Kadhar
 Master Prabhakar
 Vijaya Chandrika
 Renuka

Soundtrack 
The music was composed by K. V. Mahadevan, with lyrics by Kannadasan.

Release 
Anadhai Anandhan was released on 4 September 1970, and emerged a commercial success.

References

External links 
 

1970 films
1970s Tamil-language films
AVM Productions films
Films directed by Krishnan–Panju
Films scored by M. S. Viswanathan
Tamil films remade in other languages